Judith L. Rapoport is an American psychiatrist. She is the chief of the Child Psychiatry Branch at the National Institute of Mental Health (NIMH), part of the National Institutes of Health (NIH) in Bethesda, Maryland.

Her research focuses on diagnosis in child psychiatry, attention deficit hyperactivity disorder, and obsessive–compulsive disorder. Rapoport’s research group at NIMH also studies clinical phenomenology, neurobiology, and treatment of childhood-onset schizophrenia.

Rapoport is the author of the bestselling book, The Boy Who Couldn't Stop Washing: The Experience and Treatment of Obsessive-Compulsive Disorder (Plume, 1989), about obsessive–compulsive disorder.

Education
In 1955, Rapoport received her Bachelor of Arts degree, graduating Phi Beta Kappa and magna cum laude from Swarthmore College in Swarthmore, Pennsylvania.  She received her medical degree in 1959 from Harvard Medical School in Boston, Massachusetts.

Rapoport completed training at the National Children's Hospital in Washington, D.C. and the Karolinska University Hospital in Stockholm, Sweden.  She completed internships at Mount Sinai Hospital (Manhattan) in New York, New York, and psychiatric residencies at Massachusetts Mental Health Center in Boston, Massachusetts and St. Elizabeths Hospital in Washington, D.C. She received additional research training at NIMH’s Laboratory of Psychology in Bethesda, Maryland.

Career
Rapoport’s research group at NIMH studies the clinical phenomenology, neurobiology, and treatment of childhood-onset schizophrenia.

In 1984, Rapoport was named chief of NIMH’s Child Psychiatry Branch. In addition to her research at NIH, she holds academic appointments in psychiatry at the George Washington University School of Medicine & Health Sciences and Georgetown University School of Medicine, both in Washington, D.C.

Rapoport is a member of a number of advisory committees of national professional medical organizations, including the National Anxiety Foundation and the American Psychopathological Association, for which she served as president.  Since 1993, she has also served as a member of the scientific council of the Brain & Behavior Research Foundation. Rapoport has served on the editorial boards of Advances in Clinical Child Psychiatry, The American Journal of Psychiatry, Journal of Child Psychology and Psychiatry, and others.

She has also authored and coauthored several professional medical books, more than 300 scientific research papers, and more than 200 journal articles.
In the 60s and 70s she used school age children in drug trials at Georgetown University.

Honors
Rapoport is a member of the National Academy of Medicine and a fellow of the American Academy of Arts and Sciences.

Some of Rapoport’s honors and awards include:

 G. Burroughs Mider Lecture, National Institutes of Health, 1993
 American Psychiatric Association Award for Research, 1992
 Presidential Meritorious Executive Rank Award, 1991
 Ruane Prize for Outstanding Achievement in Child and Adolescent Psychiatric Research, Brain & Behavior Research Foundation, 2002
 Edward M. Scolnick Prize in Neuroscience, Massachusetts Institute of Technology's McGovern Institute for Brain Research, 2005
 Blanche F. Ittleson Award for Research in Child Psychiatry (1987), American Psychiatric Association.

Personal life
Rapoport is married to Stanley I. Rapoport, M.D., a neuroscientist at the National Institute on Aging who has had 19 of his research papers retracted due to scientific misconduct, whom she met at Harvard Medical School.

Further reading

 
 
 NIMH Intramural Lab biography

References

Living people
American child psychiatrists
American neuroscientists
American women neuroscientists
National Institutes of Health people
Harvard Medical School alumni
Swarthmore College alumni
American women psychiatrists
Fellows of the American Academy of Arts and Sciences
Members of the National Academy of Medicine
Year of birth missing (living people)
20th-century American women scientists
21st-century American women scientists
20th-century American women physicians
21st-century American women physicians
20th-century American physicians
21st-century American physicians